The ACT Writing and Publishing Awards are an Australian literary award presented by the ACT Writers Centre for the best books in the categories of non-fiction, fiction, poetry and children's literature written in the Canberra region.  They have been awarded since 2004.  The winners in each category receive a $500 prize.

The Anne Edgeworth Fellowship is for an emerging ACT region writer, and commemorates Anne Edgeworth (also known as Anne Godfrey-Smith).

The June Shenfield Poetry Award is for an emerging Australian poet, and is awarded in collaboration with Demos Journal.

The Marjorie Graber-McInnis Short Story Award is for an emerging ACT region writer. It was established to commemorate the late short story writer Graber-McInnis, who lived in Canberra.

The Michael Thwaites Poetry Award was previously known as the ACT Writers Centre Poetry Award.

The Publishing awards span four categories of fiction, non-fiction, poetry and children's books.

List of winners

2004
 Non-fiction – Huts in the Victorian Alps by Klaus Hueneke
 Fiction – You by Narelle Wickham
 Poetry – Indigo Book of Modern Australian Sonnets by Geoff Page

2005
 Non-fiction – Days of Innocents edited by Hilary Trotter
 Fiction – Trouble in the Garden by Peter Frankis
 Poetry – Unfinished Journey by Michael Thwaites
 Children's – The Year of the Mean Queen by Graeme Hume and Caroline Ambrus

2006
 Non-fiction – Unlocking History's Secrets by Graeme Barrow & "Australian Speculative Fiction: A Genre Overview" By Donna Maree Hanson
 Fiction – The Grinding House by Kaaron Warren
 Poetry – Southbound by Michael Byrne
 Children's – Not Awarded

2007
 Non-fiction – Men at Birth by David Vernon
 Fiction – Ghosts in the Helmet Trees by Rory Steele
 Poetry – Verbal Medicine by Tim Metcalf
 Children's – Secrets by Stephen Matthews

2008
 Non-fiction – Rainbow by Jennifer Horsfield
 Fiction – Not a Flotation Device by Peter Frankis
 Poetry – Migrant writer on a bus, thinking of Kundera by Danijela Kambaskovic-Sawers (unpublished poem by an ACT writer) Andy Jackson (unpublished poem by an Australian writer)
 Children's –

2009
 Non-fiction – The Campbell Community by Alan Foskett
 Fiction – Smoke and mirrors by Kel Robertson
 Poetry – Sleeping Alone by Michael Thorley
 Children's – Butterscotch: Family and Friends by William Nevin Morison &  Rebecca Dempsey
 Marjorie Graber-McInnis Short Story Award – Basant by Maryanne Khan

2010
 Non-fiction – Capital Sailing: The history of the Canberra Yacht Club 1959–2009 by Alan Foskett
 Fiction – Hornet Bank by Gordon Reid
 Poetry – Before Afterwards by Leon Trainor
 Children's – (not awarded)
 Short story – "Acts of Kindness" by Jennifer Shapcott

2011
 Non-fiction – Who Lied? The Ly-ee-moon Disaster and a Question of Truth by Graeme Barrow 
 Fiction – Dead Sea Fruit by Kaaron Warren 
 Poetry – A Man of Emails by Michael Byrne 
 Children's – (not awarded)
 Short story – The Day for Travelling by Robyn Cadwallader

2012 
 Marjorie Graber-McInnis Short Story Award 2012
 Winner: Paper Cranes by Rachael Rippon
 Highly Commended: Fiona Hamer
 Michael Thwaites Poetry Award 2012
 Winner: Isi Unikowski
 Highly Commended: Monica Carroll
 Children's Book category
 Winner: Tracey Hawkins
 Nonfiction Book category
 Winner: Irma Gold
 Highly Commended: Ann Villiers
 Highly Commended: Alan Foskett
 Fiction Book Category
 Winner: Nigel Featherstone
 Highly Commended: Irma Gold
 Highly Commended: Elizabeth Egan
 Poetry Book Category
 Winner: Michael Byrne
 Z4 Award for book reviews
 Winner: Colin Steele

2013 
 Marjorie Graber-McInnis Short Story Award 2013
 Winner: This Square Called a Ring by Monica Carroll
 Highly Commended:
 Breath by Michelle Brock
 Feather-light by Claire Delahunty
 Michael Thwaites Poetry Award 2013
 Winner: Ode to a Toothbrush by Penny O'Hara
 Highly Commended:
 After Nights by Claire Delahunty
 An Untimely Death by Rebecca Fleming
 Nonfiction Book Category
 Winner: Canberry Tales: An Informal History (Arcadia) by G.A. Mawer
 Highly Commended: Leaving the Rest Behind: An Immigrant’s Story by Ann Nugent
 Fiction Book Category
 Winner: Through Splintered Walls (Twelfth Planet Press) by Kaaron Warren
 Highly Commended:
 I’m Ready Now (Blemish Books) by Nigel Featherstone
 Provocation (Arcadia) by Donald McMaster
 Poetry Book Category
 Winner: First…Then… (Ginninderra Press) by Melinda Smith 
 Highly Commended:
 The Love Procession (Ginninderra Press) by Suzanne Edgar
 In Country (Bat Trang Road Press) by Leon Trainor
 Children's Book Category
 Co-winner: Sarah’s Song (A Tiny Publication) by Tanya Davies
 Co-winner: My Aunt Ate a Plate (Starry Night Publishing) by Maree Teychenne
 Z4 Award for book reviews
 Winner: Duncan Driver’s review of Martin Amis’s novel Lionel Asbo: State of England
 Anne Edgeworth Fellowship for Young ACT Writers
 Brian Obiri-Asare to produce his play In Between the Solitude of Sunburnt Islands

2014 
 Marjorie Graber-McInnis Short Story Award 2014
 Winner: ‘A White Woman in Ōjin’ by Ashley Thomson
 Highly Commended:
 ‘Hooking In''' by Christine Kearney
 ‘The Loose Thread and the Sterile Needles’ by Cara Lennon
 ‘The Garden House’ by Alison O’Hara
 Michael Thwaites Poetry Award 2014
 Winner: ‘Stilettos’ by Robyn Lance
 Highly Commended:
 ‘Calling me in’ by Susan McGrath
 ‘Jack and Jill’ by Gregory A Gould
 ‘Implausible Birds’ by Kavya Robinson
 Nonfiction Book Category
 Winner: 18 Days – Al Jazeera English and the Egyptian Revolution (Editia) by Scott Bridges
 Highly Commended:
 Meat Pies and Mumbling Blokes – A Canberra Memoir (Ginninderra Press) by Margitta Acker
 Australian Eagles: Australians in the Battle of Britain (Barrallier Books) by Kristen Alexander
 Fiction Book Category
 Winner: The Happiness Jar (Storytorch Press) by Samantha Tidy
 Highly Commended: Round and Round by Jordan Morris
 Poetry Book Category
 Winner: The Petrov Poems ( Pitt Street Poetry) by Lesley Lebkowicz
 Highly Commended:
 Improving the News (Pitt Street Poetry) by Geoff Page
 Drag down to unlock or place an emergency call (Pitt Street Poetry) by Melinda Smith
 Extravagance (Ginninderra Press) by Irene Wilkie
 Children's Book Category
 Winner: An Aussie Year (Exisle Publishing) by Tania McCartney
 Highly Commended:
 The Very Sad Fish-lady by Joy McDonald
 A Lion, a Whale and a Flea by Maree Teychenne
 Anne Edgeworth Fellowship for Young ACT Writers
 Winners: Zoya Patel and Lisa Fuller

 2015 
 Marjorie Graber-McInnis Short Story Award 2015
 Winner: Torvald's Year by C.H. Pearce
 Highly Commended: Frozen Stiff by Elizabeth Egan
 Highly Commended: Now and Then by Jennifer Hand
 Michael Thwaites Poetry Award 2015
 Winner: Ode to a Papermate Inkjoy 100 by Penny O'Hara
 Highly Commended: Winter evening on the Monaro by Laurence Anderson
 Highly Commended: Action (Bus Route 2) by Sarah Rice
 Highly Commended: Memorabilia by Michelle Brock
 Z4 Review Writing Award 2015
 Winner: Excavate by Shu-Ling Chua
 Publishing Awards: Fiction Category
 Winner: Uncle Adolf by Craig Cormick
 Highly Commended: Capital Yarns by Sean Costello
 Publishing Awards: Nonfiction Category
 Winner: Australia's Few and the Battle of Britain by Kristen Alexander
 Highly Commended: The Pearl King by Robert Lehane
 Publishing Awards: Children's Fiction Category
 Winner: Midnight Burial by Pauline Deeves
 Highly Commended: Tottie and Dot by Tania McCartney
 Publishing Awards: Poetry Category
 Winner: Fire in the Afternoon by John Stokes
 Highly Commended: The Stars Like Sand: Australian Speculative Poetry by P. S. Cottier and Tim Jones
 Anne Edgeworth Fellowship for Young Writers
 Winner: Louis Klee

 2016 
 Fiction
 Winner: Cranky Ladies of History edited by Tansy Rayner Roberts & Tehani Wessely
 Highly Commended: Olmec Obituary (Dr Pimms, Intermillennial Sleuth series) by L.J.M. Owen
 Highly Commended: Undad by Shane W. Smith
 Nonfiction
 Winner: Building a City: CS Daley and the Story of Canberra by Jennifer Horsfield
 Highly Commended: Paths into Inner Canberra by P.S. Cottier
 Highly Commended: Australian Predators of the Sky by Penny Olsen
 Highly Commended: Weekend Warriors: A Funny Side by James Sanderson
 Children's
 Winner: Horace the Baker’s Horse by Jackie French, illustrated by Peter Bray
 Highly Commended: Lennie the Legend: Solo to Sydney by Pony by Stephanie Owen Reeder
 Highly Commended: This is Captain Cook by Tania McCartney, illustrated by Christina Booth
 Poetry
 Winner: Deep in the Valley of Tea Bowls by Kathy Kituai
 Highly Commended: Ripples Under the Skin by Janette Pieloor
 The Marjorie Graber-McInnis Short Story Award 2016
 Winner: 'Sandman' by Ron Schroer
 Second Place: ‘Roadwork Ahead’ by Greg Burgess
 Highly Commended: ‘Fight or Flight’ by Isabelo Gacusan
 Highly Commended: ‘The Abject Redemption of Athalie Roche’ by Erin Prothero
 The June Shenfield Poetry Award
 Winner: ‘Ghost’ by Hessom Razavi
 Second Place: ‘Tumbleweed’ by Daniel Hutley
 Second Place: ‘White Lilac (For Deb)’ by Saaro Umar
 Highly Commended: ‘brontebright’ by Samuel Guthrie
 Highly Commended: ‘My Grandmother’s Language’ by Nadia Niaz
 Highly Commended: ‘The Lumber Room’ by Stephen Smithyman
 The Anne Edgeworth Fellowship for Young Writers
 Winner: Rosanna Stevens
 Shortlisted: Shu-Ling Chua
 Shortlisted: Grace Finlayson
 Shortlisted: Leearni Hamilton
 2016 Judges
 Fiction: Karen Viggers & Craig Cormick
 Nonfiction: Biff Ward & Kristen Alexander
 Poetry: Geoff Page & Andrew Galan
 Children's Book: Tracey Hawkins & K.J. Taylor
 The Marjorie Graber-McInnis Short Story Award: Kaaron Warren
 The June Shenfield Poetry Award: Jenni Kemarre Martiniello, Ann Shenfield & Holly Zhangthe

 2017 

 Fiction
 Winner: The Grief Hole by Kaaron Warren
 Highly Commended: All the King's Men by Shane W. Smith
 Highly Commended: Fabel by Tom Heffernan
 Children's
 Winner: Amazing Animals of Australia's National Parks by Gina Newton
 Highly Commended: Australia Illustrated by Tania McCartney
 June Shenfield Poetry Award
 Winner: "third daughter" by Penny O'Hara
 Winner: "Recycling" by Ella Jeffery
 Highly Commended: "The Uses of a Shark" by Damen O'Brien
 Marjorie Graber-McInnis Short Story Award
 Winner: "273" by Cherisse Kelly
 Highly Commended: "The Secret Moons: by Frances Seymour
 Highly Commended: "Intersection" by James Salvage
 Anne Edgeworth Fellowship
 Winner: Jemimah Cooper
 Winner: Jacqueline de Rose-Ahern
 Highly Commended: Ellen Harvey
 Highly Commended: Kathryn Hind

 2018 

 Fiction
 Winner: Paper Cuts: Comedic and satirical monologues for audition or performance by Kirsty Budding
 Nonfiction
 Winner: Verity by Robert Lehane
 Children's
 Winner: Trouble in Tune Town by Maura Pierlot
 Poetry
 Winner: A Constellation of Abnormalities by Paul Cliff
 The Marjorie Graber-McInnis Short Story Award
 Winner: Loyal Animals by Amanda McLeod
 The June Shenfield Poetry Award
 Winner: Incursion, Extinctions by Natalie Cooke
 The Anne Edgeworth Fellowship for Young Writers
 Winner: Gemma Killen

 2019 

 Fiction
 Winner: Triumviratus by Shane Smith
 Highly Commended: A Perfect Marriage by Alison Booth
 Highly Commended: After She Left by Penelope Hanley
 Highly Commended: Years of the Wolf by Craig Cormick
 Nonfiction
 Winner: Backseat Drivers by Craig Cormick
 Highly Commended: Joe Baker by Angelika Erpic
 Highly Commended: Fire at Sea: HMAS Westralia 1998 by Kathryn Spurling
 Children's
 Winner: Billie by Nicole Godwin and Demelsa Haughton
 Winner: When Worlds Collide by Amy Laurens
 Poetry
 Winner: Things I’ve Thought to Tell You Since I Saw You Last by Penelope Layland
 Highly Commended: Inlandia by Ka Nelson
 The Marjorie Graber-McInnis Short Story Award
 Winner: "Pig Headed" by Ron Schroer
 Highly Commended: "Nobody's Home" by Sophie Campbell
 Highly Commended: "The Shearer's Wife" by Elizabeth Egan
 The June Shenfield Poetry Award
 Winner: "Satan’s Brew" by Riahta Ranford
 Highly Commended: "Last Lights On the Great Divide" by Simone King
 Highly Commended: "Keeping My Wits About Me" by Rosalind Moran
 The Anne Edgeworth Fellowship for Young Writers
 Winner: Kellie Nissen
 Highly Commended: Simone King
 Highly Commended: Rebekka Leary
 Highly Commended: Gemma Nethercote Way
 2019 Judges
 Fiction:  Kaaron Warren and Margaret Innes
 Nonfiction: Amy Walters and Peter Papathansiou
 Poetry:  Hazel Hall and Merlinda Bobis
 Children's Book: Tania McCartney and Jacqueline de Rose-Ahern
 The Marjorie Graber-McInnis Short Story Award:  Beatrice Smith
 The June Shenfield Poetry Award: Lucy Alexander

 2020 
 Fiction
 Winner: The Light Bearer by Andrew Einspruch
 Highly Commended: A Tale of Stars and Shadow by Lisa Cassidy
 Highly Commended: How Not To Acquire A Castle by Amy Laurens
Highly Commended: Into Bones like Oil by Kaaron Warren
 Nonfiction
 Winner: Bandit Saints of Java by George Quinn
 Highly Commended: Out of Order by Rob Donnelly
 Highly Commended:  Families in the Digital Age by Toni Hassan
 Children's
 Winner: Fauna: Australia's Most Curious Creatures by Tania McCartney
 Highly Commended: Leaping Lola by Tracey Hawkins and Anil Tortop
 Poetry
 Winner: Acting Like a Girl by Sandra Renew
 Highly Commended: blur by the by Cham Zhi Yi
Highly Commended: Catching the Light'' by Suzanne Edgar
 The Marjorie Graber-McInnis Short Story Award
 Winner: "Bygone" by Sophie Clews
 Highly Commended: "The Navigators" by Mick Donaldson
Highly Commended: "Vertical" by Ian Hart
 Highly Commended: "The Suitcase" by Deborah Huff-Horwood
 The June Shenfield Poetry Award
 Winner: "Part of its trunk" by Elanna Herbert
 Second Place: "Paper Daisies" by Carmel Summers
 Third Place: "The Cleaning Woman" by Carla de Goede
 The Anne Edgeworth Fellowship for Young Writers
 Winner: Natalie Cooke
Winner: Emilie Morscheck
 2020 Judges
 Fiction: Andrew Hutchinson and Leife Shallcross
 Nonfiction: Helen Ennis and Patrick Mullins
Poetry:  Andrew Galan and Eleanor Malbon
 Children's Book: Leanne Barrett and Jacqueline de Rose-Ahern
 The Marjorie Graber-McInnis Short Story Award:  Beatrice Smith
 The June Shenfield Poetry Award: Judith Nangala Crispin and Scott-Patrick Mitchell

References

External links
 Judges Comments from the 2006 Awards

Culture of Canberra
Australian poetry awards
Australian fiction awards
Awards established in 2004
Australian non-fiction book awards